Aloko Udapadi is a 2017 Sinhala epic historical film based on the story of King Valagamba of Anuradhapura (89 – 77 BCE). It was co-directed by Chathra Weeraman and Baratha Hettiarachchi produced by Thusitha Wijayasena for Art Movies. The screenplay was written by Saman Weeraman. The film stars Uddika Premarathna, Dilhani Ekanayake, Nirosha Thalagala, Menaka Peiris and Roshan Ravindra. It is the 1268th Sri Lankan film in the Sinhalese cinema.

Aloko Udapadi was released on 20 January 2017 in EAP Circuit Cinemas.
The film was praised by the critics for its action sequences and the performances of the cast.
It successfully passed 100 days in theatres as well.

Plot
The film revolves around the story of the Buddha's dispensation in written form after long centuries of oral tradition in a turbulent historical context. King Valagamba was overthrown five months after his coronation by a rebellion and invasion from South India, but regained the throne after fourteen years by defeating the invaders.

Walagamba, the central character in the film, ascended to the throne in 103 BCE and was the fourth son of King Saddha Tissa, younger brother to King Dutugamunu. Walagamba became king at a time when the kingdom was under multiple threats. Walagamba's first period of rule was shattered in three months by Cholian invaders. The film recreates the efforts to preserve the sacred heritage of the Buddha's teaching and marks an important chapter in the development of the Buddhist faith.

Cast
 Uddika Premarathna as King Walagamba
 Dilhani Ekanayake as Queen Consort Anula
 Nirosha Thalagala as Royal Consort Somadevi
 Sammu Kashun as Godaththa Thero
 Roshan Ravindra as Theeya Brahmin
 Menaka Peiris as Chola wife
 Mauli Maheesha as Prince Chulika
 Nayana Manujitha as Prince Mahanaga
 Dineth de Silva as Minister Uththiya
 Ajith Kumara as Minister Pabbatha
 Nihal Fernando as Pulahatta
 Kapila Sigera as Bahiya
 Dilip Manohara as Panya Mara 
 Cletus Mendis as Pilaya Mara
 Darshan Dharmaraj as Dathika
 W. Jayasiri as Jain Nighantha Giri
 Buddhadasa Vithanarachchi as Chief monk Mahatissa
 Janak Premalal as Regional Sinhalese king
 Sammu Kasun as Godatta Thero
 Rajasinghe Loluwagoda as Chulasiva Thero
 Sirisena Pallewatte as Isidatta Thero
 Indika Madurage as Mahasona Thero
 Douglas Ranasinghe as Thanasiva
 Sunil Weerasinghe as Astrologist
 Nethalie Nanayakkara as Elderly mother

Production

Filming

Shooting of the film began in Anuradhapura, Sri Lanka. Additional filming was scheduled in Kalpitiya and Teldeniya, a town in central province in Sri Lanka and lasted 62 days.

Development

For the first time in the Sri Lankan film-making, a concept called "production designing" has been introduced. This is in order to mix up every design aspect and to take them into a common ground. 
Inclusion of visual components was followed to create character profiles with determining their character elements. The film has four group of characters including king and the countrymen, Cholian Invaders, the Brahmins and Maha Sangha. This process is done to design character concepts.

Post-production

Chathra Weeraman personally supervised the film's visual effects. He studied visual effects and animation at the Multimedia University in Malaysia. Digital set extensions were used in filming palaces and battle camps in the film. 3D technology has been used in with photography and matte paintings. Computer-Generated Images (CGI) technology has been used in the film by VFX team.
In color grading process of the film met some difficulties due to the lack of available technology in Sri Lanka. The director had to solve these difficulties from India specially colorization process.

See also
 List of Asian historical drama films

References

External links
 
 
 ආලෝකෝ උදපාදී ඉන්දීය උලෙළෙන් ලෝකය හමුවට
 මට උවමනා වුණේ හරි දෙයක් කරන්නයි
 ඇය දුන් සහායට ඇයට දෙන ත්‍යාගයයි

2017 films
Films set in the Anuradhapura period
Historical epic films
Sri Lankan historical films
2010s historical films
2010s Sinhala-language films
Sri Lankan epic films